Devan Sreenivasan (born January 8, 1952), known mononymously as Devan,is an Indian film and television actor, producer, and politician. He is known for his character roles in Malayalam, Tamil, Telugu and few in Kannada and Hindi films language films.He has starred in over 380 films. After many second hero and supporting actor roles, he made his breakthrough in the 1987 film New Delhi. He later advanced to a lead actor with films like Oru Minnaminunginte Nurunguvettam (1987), Oozham (1988), Simon Peter Ninakku Vendi (1988) and Aranyakam (1988). His well-known movies such as Vietnam Colony (1992), Ekalavyan (1993), Honest Raj (1994), Baashha (1995) and Indraprasdham (1996). He is also known as 'Devji' among his fans.

Early life 
Devan was born on 5 May 1952 in Thrissur, India. His father, Sreenivasan, was a public prosecutor and his mother, Lalitha, was a doctor. He has three siblings, Shobha, Sheela and Sureshbabu. His family has a Kalaripayattu lineage. Malayalam filmmaker Ramu Kariat was his uncle. Devan completed his schooling at Government Model Higher Secondary School, Thrissur. He took bachelor's degree from St. Thomas College, Thrissur, during his college time he was a member of Kerala Students Union (KSU); his parents were Indian National Congress-leaning. His father wanted him to be a police officer, but he wanted to be in army. After graduation, he tried at the National Defence Academy, but was not selected. He went to Madras (now Chennai) in search of a job and later took post-graduation in Master of Business Administration.

Career 
During his time in college, he used to read books a lot. He found possibility for a film in N. N. Pisharody's novel Vellam, he approached director Hariharan, who agreed with him, M. T. Vasudevan Nair wrote the screenplay, it was the first and last screenplay of his not based on his own story. Devan produced the film, filming was halted midway due to financial crisis. He made his acting debut in Ashatapathi to raise fund to resume filming, it was followed by a number of acting projects. After which, shooting resumed, but upon release, the film failed at the box office. In an interview, he said that Vellam (1985) is the best film come out from Hariharan-M. T. Vasudevan Nair combination. It was in the 1987 film New Delhi that he first appeared as a villain, since then he was typecast as a villain in Malayalam cinema. However, in Telugu cinema, he is known for character roles. Devan recalled in an interview that his best roles were in Telugu and Tamil cinema.

He was engaged in several business ventures before starting his career in movies.

Devan started his acting career in supporting roles, after being approached by a producer at Spencer Plaza in Chennai. His most notable movies are Ekalavyan, Baasha and Indraprasdham. He has also acted in several TV series.

Personal life
He was married to his uncle Ramu Kariat's daughter, Suma. The couple has a daughter named Lakshmi. His wife Suma died on 12 July 2019 due to H1N1 infection.

Politics
Devan was an active supporter of Indian National Congress in his college days. Later he became founder and leader of the Kerala People's Party, a political party in the Indian state of Kerala. During the UPA regime he again worked along with the Indian National Congress. In a 2014 interview, Devan said that a politician he admired a lot was Ramakrishna Hegde. In 2021 he merged Kerala People's Party to BJP in the presence of Home Minister of India Amit Shah.

Filmography

Malayalam

 1983 –  Naadam
 1983 – Ashtapadi
 1983 – Sairandri
 1984 – Aagraham
 1984 – Aashamsakalode
 1984 – Vellam (Producer)
 1984 – Paavam Krooran
 1985 – Jwalanam
 1985 – Shatru as Rajasekharan
 1985 – Kiraatham as Artist
 1985 – Kaiyum Thalayum Purathidaruthu 
 1985 – Madhuvidhu Theerum Mumpe
 1986 – Oru Yuga Sandhya as Balachandran
 1986 – Padayani
 1986 – Niramulla Raavukal as Soman
 1986 – Panchagni 
 1986 – Vartha
 1986 – Ithu Oru Thudakkam Mathram
 1987 – Adimakal Udamakal as Vijayan
 1987 – Aadhya Rathrikku Munbu
 1987 – Vrutham as Devadas
 1987 – Amritamgamaya 
 1987 – Manivathoorile Aayiram Sivarathrikal 
 1987 – Oru Minnaminunginte Nurungu Vettam 
 1987 – Chanthayil Choodi Nilkkunna Pennu
 1987 – Naalkkavala 
 1987 – New Delhi 
 1988 – Ormayil Ennum as Suku
 1988 – Innalayude Bhakki
 1988 – Mattoru Pranaya Kadha
 1988 – Simon Peter Ninakku Vendi as Simon Peter
 1988 – Vida Parayaan Mathrem
 1988 – Mrithyunjayam as Issac
 1988 – Vaishali
 1988 – Oozham
 1988 – Athirthikal 
 1988 – Uyaran Omanikkan 
 1988 – Mattoru Pranayakatha 
 1988 – Onninu Purake Mattonnu as Inspector Mohandas
 1988 – Oru Vivaada Vishayam 
 1988 – Aranyakam 
 1988 – David David Mr.David 
 1988 – Dhinarathrangal 
 1988 – Theerthinariyam Thirayude Vedhana (Jwalanam)
 1988 – Abkari 
 1989 – Bhadrachitta as Haridasan
 1989 – Jeevitham Oru Raagam
 1989 – Adhipan 
 1989 – Ulsavapittennu 
 1989 – Ashokante Aswathikuttikku 
 1989 – Ramji Rao Speaking 
 1989 – Nair Saab 
 1989 – Naaduvazhikal 
 1989 – Jagratha
 1989 – Unnikrishnante Adyathe Christmas 
 1989 – Oru Vadakkan Veeragatha 
 1989 - Maharajavu
 1990 – Iyer The Great 
 1990 – Brahmmarakshassu
 1990 – Marupuram
 1990 – Judgement
 1990 – Shesham Screenil
 1990 – Kelikottu
 1990 – Vyooham
 1990 – Ee Thanutha Veluppan Kalathu
 1990 – Randaam Varavu as DYSP Balu
 1990 – Malootty
 1991 – Thudarkadha as Ravi Varma
 1991 – Kilukkam
 1991 – Anaswaram
 1992 – Police Dairy
 1992 – Malootty 
 1992 – Poochakkaru Manikettum
 1992 – Grihapravesam
 1992 – Manthrikacheppu
 1992 – Ponnaramthottathe Rajavu
 1992 – Kaazhchakkappuram
 1992 – Kauravar
 1993 – O Faby
 1993 – Aalavattam
 1993 – Ghoshayaathra as Jamal
 1993 – Gaandharvam 
 1993 – Vietnam Colony 
 1993 – Ekalavyan
 1993 – Yaadhavam
 1993 – Jackpot
 1994 – Chief Minister K R Gouthami
 1994 – Ezhuthachan
 1994 – Rudraksham 
 1994 – Pingami 
 1994 – Cabinet 
 1995 – The King 
 1995 – Sundarimaare Sookshikkuka as Raju
 1995 – Hijack as Swami/Ravindra Varma
 1995 – Chantha
 1995 – Agnidevan
 1995 – Nirnnayam 
 1996 – Mahatma 
 1996 – Indraprastham 
 1996 – Dominic Presentation 
 1996 – Sulthan Hyderali 
 1996 – Aayiram Naavulla Ananthan 
 1997 – Janathipathyam 
 1997 – Poomarathanalil as Narendran
 1997 – Ranger
 1997 – Gangothri
 1997 – Bhoopathi 
 1997 – Maasmaram 
 1997 – Kannur 
 1997 – Snehasindooram 
 1997 – Sankeerthanam Pole 
 1997 – Five Star Hospital 
 1998 – Harthaal
 1998 – Sooryaputhran
 1998 – Chitrashalabham 
 1998 – Achamakuttiyude Achayan 
 1998 – Ayal Kadha Ezhuthukayanu 
 1999 – Pallavur Devanarayanan 
 1999 – Captain as John Samuel
 1999 – Jananayakan as Sathyapalan
 1999 – Niram 
 1999 – Garshom 
 2000 – Arayannegalude Veedu 
 2000 – Millenium Stars 
 2000 – Indriyam 
 2000 – Nisheedhini
 2000 – India Gate as Vishwanadhan
 2000 – Rapid Action Force
 2000 – The Judgement
 2000 – Sradha 
 2000 - The Warrant as Mohan Gandhi Raman
 2000 – F.I.R 
 2000 – Priyam 
 2000 – Summer Palace 
 2001 – Akaashathile Paravakal as Karunan
 2001 – Onnam Raagam
 2001 – Nee Enikkayi Mathrem 
 2001 – Ee Raavil
 2001 – Praja
 2001 – Sraavu as Captain Napoleon
 2001 – Sathyameva Jayathe 
 2001 – Sahayathrikakku Snehapoorvam 
 2001 – Goa as Sam Alex
 2001 – Achaneyanenikkishtam 
 2001 – Jwalanam 
 2002 – Khakhi Nakshatram as George
 2002 – Kalachakram 
 2002 – Kanmashi
 2002 – Puthooram Puthri Unniyarcha as Chandu
 2002 – Vaanibham
 2002 – Niramulla Swapnagal
 2002 – Desam as Unni
 2002 – Akhila as Balan 
 2002 – India Gate
 2003 – Mr. Brahmachari 
 2003 – Kanmashi
 2004 – Priyam Priyankaram 
 2004 – Nirappakittu
 2004 – Ennittum as Chandu
 2004 – Udayam 
 2005 – December as Issac
 2005 – Finger Print 
 2005 – Bunglavil Outha 
 2005 – Bus Conductor 
 2006 – Pathaka as Rajan Nadar
 2006 – Highway Police as DSP Somanathan
 2006 – Red Salute
 2006 – Narakasuran
 2006 – Bada Dosth as Minister K.D
 2006 – Balram Vs Tara Das 
 2006 – Vargam (Malayalam)
 2006 – Thuruppugulan 
 2007 – Paranju Theeratha Visheshangal as Ashok
 2007 – Novel
 2007 – Detective 
 2007 – Mauryan 
 2007 - Athishayan
 2007 – Nasrani 
 2007 – 4 July
 2008 – Bullet 
 2008 – Parunthu 
 2008 – Novel 
 2008 - Cycle
 2009 – My Big Father as Colonel Varghese
 2009 – IG 
 2009 – Gulumal: The Escape as Emir Harish Rahman 
 2009 – Ivar Vivahitharayal 
 2009 – The Trigger
 2009 – Pathaam Adyaayam
 2009 – Banaras as Balakrishnan Nair
 2009 – Nizhal 
 2009 – Pazhassi Raja as Kunnavath nambiar
 2009 – Black Dalia as Raveendren
 2010 – Yugapurushan 
 2010 – Koottukar as Krishnan nair
 2010 – Nizhal
 2010 – 24 Hours as Vikramaditya varma
 2010 – Kaanakazchakal
 2010 – Nanthuni
 2010 – Kasba 
 2010 – Naale 
 2010 – Arayan 
 2010 – Drona
 2011 – Avan 
 2011 – Manushya Mrugam as Kochu pulose
 2011 – Film Star as Thamban
 2011 – Maanikkyakkallu
 2011 – Christian Brothers as Sudhakaran
 2011 – Mohabbath as Firoz
 2011 – Ithu Nammude Katha 
 2011 – Janapriyan  
 2011 – Veeraputhran as Adv. Krishnan
 2012 – Yaathrakkoduvil asDavid
 2012 – Aakasmikam
 2012 – Doctor Innocent Aanu as Dr. James
 2012 – Namukku Paarkkan as Isaac
 2012 – Yakshi Faithfully Yours as Appan thampuran
 2012 – Grand Master as ADGP
 2012 – The King and The Commissioner
 2012 – Manthrikan
 2012 – Simhasanam 
 2013 – Weeping Boy as Jail superintendent
 2013 – Immanuel as 
 2013 - Aan Piranna Veedu 
 2013 - Red Rain 
 2013 - Pakaram
 2013 - Manikya Thampurattiyum Christmas Carolum
 2013 – Blackberry as Minister Ramachandran
 2013 – Breaking News Live
 2013 - 3 G
 2013 - Last Bus 8:30 PM
 2014 - Law Point
 2014 – Mannar Mathai Speaking 2
 2014 – How Old Are You
 2014 - Mammiyude Swantham Achoos
 2014 - Vasanthathinte Kanal Vazhikalil
 2014 - Dial 1091
 2014 - Gamer
 2014 - Njangalku Kittiya Yelahanka Posting
 2014 - Oru New Generation Pani
 2014 - Uthara Chemmeen
 2014 - Solar Swapnam
 2014 - Avatharam
 2014 - Asha Black
 2014 - Ettekal Second
 2014 – Mr. Fraud
 2015 – Wonderful Journey
 2015 – Raag Rangeela
 2015 – Female Unnikrishnan
 2015 - Namasthe Bali Island
 2015 - Samrajyam II: Son of Alexander
 2015 - Rudrasimhasanam
 2015 - Oru New Generation Pani
 2015 - Rasam
 2015 - Calling Bell
 2016 - Plus Or Minus
 2015 - Just Married
 2015 - Marutha
 2015 - Village Guys
 2016 - Marupadi
 2016 - Dafedar
 2016 - Angane Thanne Nethave Anjettanam Pinnale
 2016 - Pretham
 2016 - Ore Mukham
 2017 - 1971 Beyond Borders
 2017 - Vishwa Vikhyatharaya Payyanmar
 2018 - Marubhoomiyile Mazhathullikal
 2018 - Ippozhum Eppozhum Sthuthiyayirikkatte
 2018 - Koodasha
 2018 - Hello Dubaikkaran
 2018 - Aravindante Athidhikal
 2018 - Koode
 2018 - Pranayatheertham
 2019 - Vijay Superum Pournamiyum
 2019 - Pattabhiraman
 2019 - Ganagandharvan
 2019 - 1948 Kaalam Paranjathu
 2019 - Mangalath Vasundhara
 2019 - Jack and Daniel
 2019 - A for Apple
 2019 - Oru Caribean Udayip
 2019 - Munthiri Monchan: Oru Thavala Paranja Kadha
 2020 - Love FM
2020  - Big Brother
2021 -Kshanam
 2022-Kalachekon
2022- Mahi

Tamil

 1993 – Prathap
 1994 – Jai Hind 
 1994 – Captain 
 1994 – Honest Raj 
 1995 – Baashha 
 1995 – Nandhavana Theru 
 1995 – Ragasiya Police 
 1997 – Mannava 
 1997 – Ullaasam 
 1997 – Thadayam
 1997 - Veerapandi Kottayiley
 1997 - My India
 1998 – Iniyavale
 1999 – En Swasa Kaatre
 1999 - Siragugal (Sun TV telefilm) 
 1999 – Rajasthan 
 1999 – Periyanna 
 1999 – Nenjinile 
 1999 – Manam Virumbuthe Unnai 
 1999 – Time 
 2000 – Vaanathaippola 
 2000 – Ennamma Kannu 
 2000 – Vaanavil 
 2001 – Rishi
 2001 – Citizen 
 2001 – Shahjahan 
 2002 – Maaran 
 2002 – Punnagai Desam 
 2002 – Raja 
 2002 – Roja Kootam 
 2002 – April Maadhathil
 2003 - Aahaa Ethanai Azhagu
 2003 – Thithikudhe 
 2003 – Indru 
 2004 - Campus
 2004 – Jai 
 2004 – Adi Thadi
 2004 - Perazhagan 
 2004 – Shock  
 2004 – Arivumani
 2004 – Arasatchi
 2004 – Bose
 2004 - Gomathi Nayagam 
 2005 – Sivakasi 
 2006 – Aathi 
 2006 – Aacharya 
 2006 – Vanjagan
 2006 – Vathiyar
 2006 – Manasukkule
 2008 – Aegan 
 2010 – Guindy 
 2010 – Thairiyam 
 2010 - Vinnaithaandi Varuvaayaa as Joseph in the film Jessie
 2011 – Kanchana 
 2011 – Konjam Sirippu Konjam Kobam 
 2012 – Murattu Kaalai 
 2013 – Chennaiyil Oru Naal 
 2013 – Masani 
 2014 - Nee Naan Nizhal
 2014 - Appavi Katteri 
 2018 - Imaikkaa Nodigal

Telugu

 1992 - Police Brothers
 1992 - Dharma Kshetram as Pandu
 1993 - Aasayam as Reddappa
 1993 - Ratha Sarathi
 1996 - Sampradhayam
 1997 - Subhakankshalu as Balaramaiah
 1997 - Pellichesukundam
 2000 - Maa Annayya
 2002 - Mounamelanoyi
 2003 - Okariki Okaru 
 2004 - Sivaram 
 2004 - Chennakesava Reddy
 2004 - Anandamanandamaye 
 2004 - Kaasi 
 2004 - Kushi Kushiga
 2007 - Desamuduru as Narayan Patwari
 2010 - Vareva
 2010 - Ye Maaya Chesave as Joseph 
 2012 - Dhamarukam as Vishwanath
 2012 - Sarocharu
 2014 - Heart Attack as Madhusudhan
 2015 - Soukhyam
 2017 - Raju Gari Gadhi 2
 2019 - Saaho

Kannada
 1995 - Deergha Sumangali

Hindi
 2019 - Saaho

Television series

See also
 Kerala Peoples Party

References

External links
 
 Devan at MSI

1952 births
Living people
Male actors from Thrissur
Indian actor-politicians
Malayali politicians
Male actors in Malayalam cinema
Indian male film actors
Bharatiya Janata Party politicians from Kerala
Politicians from Thrissur
20th-century Indian male actors
21st-century Indian male actors
Male actors in Tamil cinema
Indian male television actors
Male actors in Malayalam television
Tamil male television actors
Male actors in Telugu cinema